Charles Wolverton is the name of:

 Charles A. Wolverton (1880-1969), U.S. Representative from New Jersey
 Charles E. Wolverton (1851-1926), 18th Chief Justice on the Oregon Supreme Court